'Gli incubi di Dario Argento' is a TV series created for RAI's TV program “Giallo” by Enzo Tortora.
It is a mini-TV series and the episodes have a duration of approximately 3 minutes each. Among various episodes, Nostalgia Punk has emerged following the criticism raised by the audience after it was broadcast, due to the violent scenes, ending with a reference to Dario Argento.

Episodes
La finestra sul cortile (The window on the court)
Riti notturni (Night rituals)
Il Verme (The worm)
Amare e morire (Loving and dying)
Nostalgia punk 
La Strega (The witch) 
Addormentarsi (Falling asleep)
Sammy
L'incubo di chi voleva interpretare “l'incubo” di Dario Argento (The nightmare of the one who wished to explain Dario Argento's “nightmare”)

See also
List of Italian television series

External links
 

Italian television series
Dario Argento
1987 Italian television series debuts
1987 Italian television series endings
1980s Italian television series
RAI original programming